Taranidaphne beblammena is a species of sea snail, a marine gastropod mollusk in the family Raphitomidae.

Description
The length of the shell attains 9.7 mm, its diameter 3.6 mm.

Distribution
This marine species occurs in the Red Sea.

References

 Sturany R (1904) Expedition S.M. Schiff “Pola“ in das Rothe Meer, nördliche und südliche Hälfte. 1895/96 und 1897/98. Zoologische Ergebnisse XXIII. Gastropoden des Rothen Meeres. Denkschr mathem-naturwiss Cl k Akad Wissensch Wien 74:209–283, pls 1–7

External links
 
 Albano P.G., Bakker P.A.J., Janssen R. & Eschner A. (2017). An illustrated catalogue of Rudolf Sturany's type specimens in the Naturhistorisches Museum Wien, Austria (NHMW): Red Sea gastropods. Zoosystematics and Evolution. 93(1): 45-94

beblammena
Gastropods described in 1903